Lizzy Evoeme also known as Ovuleria, is a veteran Nigerian actress who was active from 1982 to 1993 prior to the advent of Nollywood.

Biography 
Evoeme was born in 1942 in Calabar, Cross River State to a sea worker father.

She was prominent in the Nigerian TV space as an actress from 1982 to 1993 prior to the advent of Nollywood. She was originally named Elizabeth which was later shortened to "Lizzy".

She was known for her role as Ovuleria, the wife of a no-nonsense TV character called Chief Zebrudaya Okoroigwe Nwogbo also known as Chika Okpala on the TV show, New Masquerade. The programme which used to feature on Nigeria's national TV station, NTA, has over the years been stopped. She played the role of a petty trader and an assertive but obedient woman who never disagreed or argued with her husband's decision no matter how many others disagreed with him.

She once explained that she never knew the meaning of her stage name "Ovuleria" 

Since her exit from the TV glare, not much had been heard about Evoeme. At one time, death rumours about her were refuted

Awards 
In 2020, she was recognised for her contributions to the entertainment industry

References 

People from Calabar
Living people
1942 births
20th-century Nigerian actresses
Nigerian television actresses
People from Cross River State
Nigerian film actresses